J29 may refer to:
 County Route J29 (California)
 Junkers J 29, a German experimental aircraft
 Saab J 29, a Swedish fighter aircraft
 Square gyrobicupola, a Johnson solid (J29)
 Toyota Supra (J29), a Japanese sports car